Travis Paul Golden (born May 14, 1992) is an American soccer player who played for Austin Aztex in the USL.

Career

College & Youth
Golden played four years of college soccer at Campbell University between 2010 and 2013. While at college, Golden also appeared for USL PDL club Austin Aztex in 2012.

Professional
On January 21, 2014, Golden was drafted in the fourth round (69th overall) of the 2014 MLS SuperDraft by D.C. United. However, he didn't sign with D.C. United and played with local PDL side Austin Aztex.

Golden signed with USL club Austin Aztex on November 18, 2014.

References

External links
 Austin Aztex profile

1992 births
Living people
American soccer players
Campbell Fighting Camels soccer players
Austin Aztex players
Association football defenders
Soccer players from Austin, Texas
D.C. United draft picks
USL League Two players
USL Championship players